HMS Formidable is a Type 31 frigate of the Royal Navy and the sixth vessel named after the word formidable. In May 2021, the names of the five planned Type 31 ships were announced by the First Sea Lord. The names were selected to represent key themes that represent the future plans of the Royal Navy and Royal Marines - forward deployment of ships overseas; operating in the North Atlantic; carrier operations; technology and innovation; and the Future Commando Force.

Formidable, named after the World War II-era aircraft carrier , represents carrier operations. The plan for the Type 31 project envisages all five units of the class being in service by February 2030.

References

 

Proposed ships of the Royal Navy
Type 31 frigates